Norra Kvill (literally North Kvill) is a small national park (established in 1927) near Vimmerby in Kalmar county, Småland, southeastern Sweden. The oak is thought to be about 1 000 years old.

References

External links 

 Sweden's National Parks: Norra Kvill National Park from the Swedish Environmental Protection Agency

National parks of Sweden
Protected areas established in 1927
1927 establishments in Sweden
Geography of Kalmar County
Tourist attractions in Kalmar County